In document ISO 10303-226, a fault is defined as an abnormal condition or defect at the component, equipment, or sub-system level which may lead to a failure.

In telecommunications, according to the Federal Standard 1037C of the United States, the term fault has the following meanings: 
An accidental condition that causes a functional unit to fail to perform its required function. See .
A defect that causes a reproducible or catastrophic malfunction. A malfunction is considered reproducible if it occurs consistently under the same circumstances. See .
 In power systems, an unintentional short circuit, or partial short circuit, between energized conductors or between an energized conductor and ground.   A distinction can be made between symmetric and asymmetric faults. See Fault (power engineering).

Random fault 
A random fault is a fault that occurs as a result of wear or other deterioration. Whereas the time of a particular occurrence of such a fault cannot be determined, the rate at which such faults occur within the equipment population on average can be predicted with accuracy. Manufacturers will often accept random faults as a risk if the chances are virtually negligible.
A fault can happen in virtually any object or appliance, most common with electronics and machinery.
For example, an Xbox 360 console will deteriorate over time due to dust buildup in the fans. This will cause the Xbox to overheat, cause an error, and shut the console down.

Systematic fault 
Systematic faults are often a result of an error in the specification of the equipment and therefore affect all examples of that type.  Such faults can remain undetected for years, until conditions conduce to create the failure.  Given the same circumstances, each and every example of the equipment would fail identically at that time.

Failures in hardware can be caused by random faults or systematic faults, but failures in software are always systematic.

See also
Product defect
Reliability engineering
Software bug
Defect (disambiguation)
Fault (disambiguation)

Fault tolerance
Software anomalies
Computer errors

it:Avaria